The Columbia College of Nursing (previously known as the Knowlton Hospital Training School and Columbia Hospital School of Nursing) is a nursing school, now located in Glendale, Wisconsin, a northern suburb of Milwaukee, Wisconsin, U.S.

History 
The Knowlton Hospital Training School was founded at the same time as Knowlton Hospital itself, in 1901. When Knowlton became Columbia Hospital in 1909, the name was changed to the Columbia Hospital School of Nursing. In June 2010, the College moved to a new structure in Glendale, as the existing Columbia Hospital was shutting down and the buildings (including those housing the College) were to be sold to the University of Wisconsin–Milwaukee. Columbia College of Nursing was acquired by Alverno College on July 1st, 2020. 

The college grants the Bachelor of Science in Nursing (BSN) degree.

Notable faculty
Sandy Pasch, Wisconsin state legislator, was an assistant professor at the college.

References

External links 
Archive website

Glendale, Wisconsin
Education in Milwaukee County, Wisconsin
Educational institutions established in 1901
Nursing schools in Wisconsin
Private universities and colleges in Wisconsin
1901 establishments in Wisconsin